The third season of The Voice, the Australian reality talent show, premiered on 4 May 2014 and concluded on 21 July 2014 with Anja Nissen being crowned the winner. Both Kylie Minogue and will.i.am joined the show this season (replacing Delta Goodrem and Seal, respectively) but left at the end of the season. Anja Nissen was announced the winner of this season on 21 July 2014, marking will.i.am's first and only win as a coach, as well as, the first coach to win on his exclusive season.

Teams
Color key

Blind auditions 

Color key

Episode 1 (4 May) 
The first episode of the Blind Auditions was broadcast on 4 May 2014. The coaches performed a cover of "Hall of Fame" together at the start of the show.

Episode 2 (5 May)

Episode 3 (6 May)

Episode 4 (7 May)

Episode 5 (11 May)

Episode 6 (12 May)

Episode 7 (13 May)

Episode 8 (18 May)

Episode 9 (19 May)

Episode 10 (20 May)

Battle rounds 
 – Contestant wins battle round/advances to showdown
 – Contestant loses battle round but gets saved/advances 
 – Contestant loses battle round and is eliminated

Episode 11 (25 May)
The first episode of the Battle Rounds was broadcast on 25 May 2014.
The coaches performed a cover of "Warrior" together at the start of the show.

Episode 12 (26 May)
The second episode of the Battle Rounds was broadcast on 26 May 2014.

Episode 13 (1 June)
The third episode of the Battle Rounds was broadcast on 1 June 2014.
 Guest Keith Urban ("Shame")

Episode 14 (2 June)
The fourth episode of the Battle Rounds was broadcast on 2 June 2014.

Showdown rounds
 – Contestant was sent to the Live Finals
 – Contestant was sent to the Sing Off
 – Contestant was instantly eliminated

Episode 15 (8 June)
The first episode of the Showdowns was broadcast on 8 June 2014.

Episode 16 (9 June)
The second episode of the Showdowns was broadcast on 9 June 2014.

Episode 17 (15 June)
The third episode of the Showdowns was broadcast on 15 June 2014.

Episode 18 (16 June)
The Sing Off episode, where the remaining contestants did a reprise of their audition pieces, was broadcast on 16 June 2014.

 – Contestant was sent to the Live Finals
 – Contestant was eliminated

Live shows

Episode 19 (23 June)

The first episode of the Live shows was broadcast on 23 June 2014. As for the results, there were no eliminations.
Performances from Coldplay "A Sky Full of Stars" and "Magic" from their new album Ghost Stories
Sabrina Batshon's rendition of Chandelier entered the ARIA charts at No. 39 this week.

Episode 20 (30 June)

The second episode of the Live shows was broadcast on 30 June 2014.
 Performance from Kylie Minogue with her songs Sexy Love and Love at First Sight. 
 Gabriel & Cecilia and ZK's performances both achieved the respective ARIA chart positions of No. 40 and No. 46.

Episode 21 (7 July)
The third episode of the Live shows was broadcast on 7 July 2014.
 Guest performance from The Madden Brothers with the song "We Are Done".
 ZK and Johnny Rollins performances all achieved the respective ARIA chart positions of No. 35 and No. 50.

Episode 22 (14 July)
The fourth episode of the Live shows was broadcast on 14 July 2014.
 Performance from Ricky Martin with the song "Vida"
 Johnny Rollins's rendition of "When a Man Loves a Woman" entered the ARIA charts at No. 38

Episode 23 (21 July)
The fifth episode of the Live shows was broadcast on 21 July 2014.
Guest Performances By: will.i.am & Cody Wise "It's My Birthday" and Sheppard "Geronimo".

Results Summary
 Color key

Team Will

Team Kylie

Team Joel

Team Ricky

Elimination Chart

Overall
Artist's info

Result details

Team
Artist's info

Result details

Ratings

Notes
"The Showdowns, Part 1" ranked behind a preview of the then-upcoming Voice Kids, which aired at the start of the episode.

References

External links 
 Official website

2014 Australian television seasons
3